The School of Communications and Arts (Portuguese: Escola de Comunicações e Artes) at the University of São Paulo is an institution of higher education and research in the field of Arts and Communication located in São Paulo, Brazil. It was established on June 15, 1966 as School of Cultural Communication.

Majors
University of São Paulo's undergraduate courses are spread over 36 Schools, each school with its own departments. Students that choose majors in communication and arts will have the great majority of classes in the School of Communications and Arts - although they may take subjects in different schools. ECA offers majors in all the following areas:

Dramatic Arts
Plastic Arts
Audiovisual Arts
Library Sciences
Editorial Business
Journalism
Music
Marketing, Advertisement and Publicity
Public Relations
Tourism

In total, University of São Paulo School of Communications and Arts has 22 undergraduate courses, from which 15 are devoted to Arts: Scenic Design, Theater Direction, Theater Acting, Theory of Theater, Sculpture, Engraving, Multimedia, Inter-media, Painting, Chant and Lyrical Art, Musical composition, Musical Instruments, Conducting and graduation in Art Education, Acting Performances, Fine Arts and Music; five are devoted for Social Communication, there are four options: Journalism, Publishing, Advertising and Public Relations; besides the courses of Librarianship, Tourism and Audio-visual.

Furthermore, ECA operates the School of Drama (EAD), a traditional school of theater known for its "Actor Performance" course.

Departments
Department of Acting Performances – CAC
Department of Fine Arts – CAP
Department of Librarianship and Documentation – CBD
Department of Communication and Arts – CCA
Department of Journalism and Publishing – CJE
Department of Music – CMU
Department of Public Relations, Advertising and Propaganda and Tourism – CRP
Department of Cinema, Radio and Television – CTR   
School of Drama – EAD (technical school)

Reputation

The school is currently ranked in the 46th position  worldwide for the communication subject according to QS University Rankings - information from the 2014 ranking.

Student organizations

CALC
CALC (Centro Academico Lupe Cotrim) is the Student Union responsible for representing the school's students in the university system.

Ecatletica
Organization responsible for providing training in a variety of sports for ECA students. It was created in 1971 within the Student Union but in 1990 it became an independent organization.

ECA Junior
ECA Junior is an Advertising company ran by students of the Department of Public Relations, Advertising, Propaganda and Tourism. It was created in the 1990s by students in the major of Social Communication Advertising and Publicity. The organization is supported by major Brazilian companies like Petrobras and it aims at providing advertising services to small companies unable to afford the high cost of traditional advertising.

See also 

 Renata Pallottini
 Lupe Cotrim

References

University of São Paulo
Art schools in Brazil